In probability and statistics, the generalized integer gamma distribution (GIG) is the distribution of the sum of independent 
gamma distributed random variables, all with integer shape parameters and different rate parameters. This is a special case of the generalized chi-squared distribution. A related concept is the generalized near-integer gamma distribution (GNIG).

Definition

The random variable   has a gamma distribution with shape parameter  and rate parameter  if its probability density function is

and this fact is denoted by 

Let , where  be  independent random variables, with all  being positive integers and all  different. In other words, each variable has  the Erlang distribution with different shape parameters.

Then the random variable Y defined by

has a GIG (generalized integer gamma) distribution of depth  with shape parameters   and rate parameters  .  This fact is denoted by

It is also a special case of the generalized chi-squared distribution.

Properties
The probability density function and the cumulative distribution function of Y are respectively given by

and

where

and

with

and

where

Alternative expressions are available in the literature on generalized chi-squared distribution, which is a field wherecomputer algorithms have been available for some years.

Generalization
The GNIG (generalized near-integer gamma) distribution of depth  is the distribution of the random variable

Properties

and the cumulative distribution function is given by

where 

with  given by -() above.  In the above expressions  is the Kummer confluent hypergeometric function. This  function has usually very good convergence properties and is nowadays easily handled by a number of software packages.

Applications
The GIG and GNIG distributions are the basis for the exact and near-exact distributions of a large number of likelihood ratio test statistics and related statistics used in multivariate analysis.  More precisely, this application is usually for the exact and near-exact distributions of the negative logarithm of such statistics. If necessary, it is then easy,   through a simple transformation, to obtain the corresponding exact or near-exact distributions for the corresponding likelihood ratio test statistics themselves. 

The GIG distribution is also the basis for a number of wrapped distributions in the wrapped gamma family.

As being a special case of the generalized chi-squared distribution, there are many other applications; for example, in renewal theory and in multi-antenna wireless communications.

Computer modules
Modules for the computation of the p.d.f. and c.d.f. of both the GIG and the GNIG distributions are made available at this web-page on near-exact distributions.

References

Continuous distributions
Factorial and binomial topics